Luria pulchra is a species of sea snail, a cowry, a marine gastropod mollusk in the family Cypraeidae, the cowries.

Subspecies
The following subspecies are recognized :
 Luria pulchra akabensis  
 Luria pulchra pulchra (Gray, J.E., 1824)  (synonyms : Cypraea pulchella Gray, J.E., 1824; Cypraea viridacea Sulliotti, G.R., 1924)
 Luria pulchra sinaiensis Heiman & Mienis, 2000

Description
L. pulchra is superficially similar to L. lurida. L.pulchra is less swollen, smoother, glossier, and lighter in color.

Distribution
This species is distributed in the Red Sea, the Gulf of Aqaba, the Gulf of Oman, the Persian Gulf and along Eritrea.

References

External links

Cypraeidae
Gastropods described in 1824